William Earl Casper Jr. (June 24, 1931 – February 7, 2015) was an American professional golfer. He was one of the most prolific tournament winners on the PGA Tour from the mid-1950s to the mid-1970s.

In his youth, Casper started as a caddie and emerged from the junior golf hotbed of San Diego, where golf could be played year-round, to rank seventh all-time in career Tour wins with 51, across a 20-year period between 1956 and 1975. Fellow San Diegan great Gene Littler was a friend and rival from teenager to senior. Casper won three major championships, represented the United States on a then-record eight Ryder Cup teams, and holds the U.S. record for career Ryder Cup points won. After reaching age 50, Casper regularly played the Senior PGA Tour and was a winner there until 1989. In his later years, Casper successfully developed businesses in golf course design and management of golf facilities.

Casper served as Ryder Cup captain in 1979, was twice PGA Player of the Year (1966 and 1970), was twice leading money winner, and won five Vardon Trophy awards for the lowest seasonal scoring average on the Tour.

Respected for his extraordinary putting and short-game skills, Casper was a superior strategist who overcame his distance disadvantages against longer-hitting competitors such as Arnold Palmer and Jack Nicklaus with moxie, creative shot-making, and clever golf-course management abilities. Never a flashy gallery favorite, Casper developed his own self-contained style, relying on solid technique, determination, concentration, and perseverance.

He converted to the LDS Church in 1966. Casper was inducted to the World Golf Hall of Fame in 1978.

Early years
Casper was born in San Diego, California. His father started him in golf at age five. Casper caddied during his youth at San Diego Country Club to earn money for golf, and spent one semester at the University of Notre Dame on a golf scholarship, after graduating from high school. He returned to San Diego to marry his wife Shirley in 1952. Casper competed frequently as an amateur against fellow San Diegan Gene Littler. He turned professional in 1954.

Professional career

Casper had 51 PGA Tour wins in his career, with his first coming in 1956. This total places him seventh on the all-time list. His victories helped him finish third in McCormack's World Golf Rankings in 1968, 1969 and 1970, the first three years they were published. He won three major championships: the 1959 and 1966 U.S. Opens, and the 1970 Masters Tournament.

He was the PGA Tour Money Winner in 1966 and 1968. He was PGA Player of the Year in 1966 and 1970. Casper won the Vardon Trophy for lowest scoring average five times: 1960, 1963, 1965, 1966, and 1968.

Casper was a member of the United States team in the Ryder Cup eight times: 1961, 1963, 1965, 1967, 1969, 1971, 1973, 1975, and a non-playing captain in 1979. Casper has scored the most points in the Ryder Cup by an American player.

Casper won at least one PGA Tour event for 16 straight seasons, from 1956 to 1971, the third-longest streak, trailing only Arnold Palmer and Jack Nicklaus, who each won on Tour in 17 straight years.

On the senior circuit, Casper earned nine Senior PGA Tour (now the Champions Tour) wins from 1982 to 1989, including two senior majors.

Legacy
Much has been written in the annals of golf that Casper was the most underrated star in golf history, and the best modern golfer who never received the accolades he deserved. He was not considered one of the "Big Three" — Jack Nicklaus, Arnold Palmer and Gary Player — who are widely credited with popularizing and bringing enormous commercial success to the sport around the world; however, between 1964 and 1970, Casper won 27 tournaments on the PGA Tour, two more than Nicklaus and six more than Palmer and Player combined, during that time period. He is considered by many to have been the best putter of his era.

Casper's 20-year period of winning on the PGA Tour—between 1956 and 1975—was an era of extraordinary growth in tournament purses, television coverage and depth of competition. Casper faced legends such as Palmer, Nicklaus, Sam Snead, Cary Middlecoff, Gary Player and Lee Trevino when they were all at or near their peaks.

Casper was inducted into the World Golf Hall of Fame in 1978. In 2000, he was ranked as the 15th greatest golfer of all time by Golf Digest magazine.

Casper's grandson, Mason Casper, played for the Utah Valley University golf team. Mason qualified for NCAA post-season play in 2012.

Personal life
Casper was a member of the Church of Jesus Christ of Latter-day Saints, joining in early 1966 at age 34, at the height of his playing career.

Casper died at age 83 in 2015 of a heart attack at his home in Springville, Utah. He was survived by his wife of more than 60 years, Shirley Franklin Casper, 11 children, six of whom are adopted, 71 grandchildren and numerous great-grandchildren.

Other ventures

Golf course design and management

After his professional career, Casper was a designer for many golf courses, such as The Highlands, The Palm and Eagle Crest in Sun City Summerlin, Nevada. He also designed the Hidden Oaks Golf Course, 9 holes of a beloved Par 3 in a residential neighborhood just north of Santa Barbara, CA. As of 2017, Billy Casper Golf (BCG) is one of the largest privately owned golf course management companies in the United States, with roughly 150 owned or managed courses in their portfolio. Billy Casper Golf annually hosts the "World's Largest Golf Outing" – a national golf outing fundraiser benefiting military charities.

Acting
Casper had a cameo appearance in the movie, Now You See Him, Now You Don't.

Billy's Kids
Casper was active in charitable work for children and hosted fundraisers, including an annual tournament at San Diego Country Club for "Billy's Kids".

Books

Professional wins (72)

PGA Tour wins (51)

PGA Tour playoff record (8–8)

Source:

European Tour wins (1)

Latin American wins (4)

Other wins (6)

Senior PGA Tour wins (9)

Senior PGA Tour playoff record (2–3)

Other senior wins (1)
1984 Liberty Mutual Legends of Golf (with Gay Brewer)

Major championships

Wins (3)

1 Defeated Palmer in an 18-hole playoff: Casper 69 (−1), Palmer 73 (+3).
2 Defeated Littler in an 18-hole playoff: Casper 69 (−3), Littler 74 (+2).

Results timeline

CUT = missed the half-way cut
WD = withdrew
"T" = tied

Summary

Most consecutive cuts made – 27 (1962 PGA – 1971 Masters)
Longest streak of top-10s – 4 (twice)

Champions Tour major championships

Wins (2)

1 18-hole playoff finished in a tie, Casper (75) to Funseth (75), Casper won with a birdie on the first sudden-death hole.

U.S. national team appearances
Professional
Ryder Cup: 1961 (winners), 1963 (winners), 1965 (winners), 1967 (winners), 1969 (winners), 1971 (winners), 1973 (winners), 1975 (winners), 1979 (winners, non-playing captain)

See also
List of golfers with most PGA Tour wins
List of men's major championships winning golfers
List of longest PGA Tour win streaks

References

Further reading

External links

Billy Casper Golf Academy

American male golfers
Notre Dame Fighting Irish men's golfers
PGA Tour golfers
PGA Tour Champions golfers
Winners of men's major golf championships
Winners of senior major golf championships
Ryder Cup competitors for the United States
World Golf Hall of Fame inductees
Golf course architects
Golf writers and broadcasters
Golfers from San Diego
American businesspeople
American memoirists
Writers from San Diego
Latter Day Saints from California
Converts to Mormonism
Sportspeople from Chula Vista, California
People from Springville, Utah
1931 births
2015 deaths